Dinner for Adele is a 1977 Czech parody comedy film directed by Oldřich Lipský. Alternative titles were Adele Hasn't Had Her Dinner Yet, Nick Carter in Prague and Adela Has Not Had Supper Yet.

Production
The main character is a parody of the detective Nick Carter from American dime novels. Most exterior scenes were shot around Prague, including Prague main railway station, Hotel Paris, Hradčany, Letná Park and Konopiště. The carnivorous plant and animated sequences were created by Czech surrealist artist Jan Švankmajer.

Plot
It is the turn from the nineteenth to the twentieth century. Countess Thun asked the famous New York detective Nick Carter to travel to Prague, for assistance to solve the strange case of a missing dog. Carter is assisted by Prague police commissar Ledvina. Mysterious murder cases happen during the investigations, done by the malicious botanist Baron von Kratzmar and his carnivorous plant Adela. Von Kratzmar kidnapped his victims, bound them and whenever he played a gramophone with the melody "Schlafe, mein Prinzchen" (a lullaby by Bernhard Flies but previously associated with Wolfgang Amadeus Mozart) it is the time for Adela to awaken and eat her victims for dinner. Baron von Kratzmar considered himself a misjudged genius and wanted to take revenge on one of his former professors. He called himself "the Gardener" a notorious criminal, who Nick Carter thought had died in the swamps years ago. With the help of bizarre inventions, Ledvina and Carter succeed in catching von Kratzmar and delivering him to the legal authorities.

Cast
 Michal Dočolomanský as Nick Carter
 Rudolf Hrušínský as Commissar Josef Ledvina
 Miloš Kopecký as Baron Ruppert von Kratzmar
 Ladislav Pešek as Biology professor Albín Boček 
 Naďa Konvalinková as Květuška, Boček's granddaughter
 Václav Lohniský as Kratzmar's butler
 Květa Fialová as Countess Thun
 Olga Schoberová as Karin 
 Martin Růžek as Police director Franz von Kaunitz 
 Karel Effa as Criminal
 František Němec as Nick Carter (voice)
 Libuše Švormová as Karin (voice)
 Gene Deitch as Larry Matejka (voice)

Reception
The film was positively received by both domestic and foreign critics. Sheila Benson wrote in Los Angeles Times: "This spoof on detective Nick Carter is crammed with invention, wit of the highest order, exquisite tongue-in-cheek performances and all the art noveau wonders in Prague." Seattle Times favorably compared Lipský to Mel Brooks.

Awards and nominations
1980: Saturn Award for Best Foreign Film
1980: Saturn Award Nomination for Best Fantasy Film

The film was also selected as the Czechoslovak entry for the Best Foreign Language Film at the 51st Academy Awards, but was not accepted as a nominee.

See also
 The Mysterious Castle in the Carpathians
 List of submissions to the 51st Academy Awards for Best Foreign Language Film
 List of Czechoslovak submissions for the Academy Award for Best Foreign Language Film

References

External links
 Pictures from the film
 

1977 films
Czechoslovak comedy films
Czech comedy films
1970s Czech-language films
Films about plants
Films directed by Oldřich Lipský
1970s black comedy films
1970s parody films
Films set in the 1900s
Films set in Prague
Nick Carter (literary character)
Jan Švankmajer
1970s police comedy films
Films with screenplays by Jiří Brdečka
1977 comedy films
Czech parody films